The diocese  of Laon in the present-day département of Aisne, was a Catholic diocese for around 1300 years, up to the French Revolution. Its seat was in Laon, France, with the Laon Cathedral. From early in the 13th century, the bishop of Laon was a Pair de France, among the elite.

History

The Diocese of Laon was evangelized at an uncertain date by St. Beatus; the see was founded in 487 by St. Remy, who cut it off from the archbishopric of Reims and appointed his nephew St. Genebaldus as bishop.

After an attempt made by the unexecuted Concordat of 11 June 1817 to re-establish the See of Laon, the bishop of Soissons was authorized by Pope Leo XII (13 June 1828) to join the title of Laon to that of his own see.  Pope Leo XIII (11 June 1901) further authorized it to use the title of St-Quentin, which was formerly the residence of the bishop of Noyon.

Bishops
Louis Séguier, nominated by Henry IV of France, Bishop of Laon in 1598, refused the nomination to make room for his young nephew Peter de Bérulle, afterwards cardinal and founder of the Oratorians.  De Bérulle refused the see.

To 1000

1000 to 1300

1300 to 1500

From 1500

See also
 Catholic Church in France
 List of Catholic dioceses in France

References

Bibliography

Reference works
  (Use with caution; obsolete)
  (in Latin) 
 (in Latin)

Studies

External links
Catholic Encyclopedia Source

Laon
Diocese
Dioceses established in the 5th century
487 establishments
5th-century establishments in sub-Roman Gaul